The Preston E. Smith Unit is a state prison for men located in Lamesa, Dawson County, Texas, owned and operated by the Texas Department of Criminal Justice.  This facility was opened in October 1992, and a maximum capacity of 2234 male inmates held at various security levels.  

The prison was named for Texas governor Preston Smith.

References

Prisons in Texas
Buildings and structures in Dawson County, Texas
1992 establishments in Texas